Mona Rico was a Mexico-born American actress. Her films include Eternal Love (1929), Shanghai Lady (1929), A Devil With Women (1930), and Zorro Rides Again (1937).

Career
Born as Enriqueta de Valenzuela in Mexico City, Mexico, she came to Hollywood at the age of 19 in April 1928 and managed to secure a five-year acting contract. Her first role of significance came opposite John Barrymore as the third lead in a United Artists motion picture, Eternal Love. It was reported that she was sitting in the casting room of the studio when a girl's hands were needed in a film test being made by Ernst Lubitsch. She was sent to Lubitsch and, after her hands were recorded, he made an entire test of her. The following day she obtained her contract. She was cast as a Spanish dancing girl in Shanghai Lady.

Personal life
Rico became an American citizen at age 23. She married wealthy sportsman James N. Crofton, part-owner of the Agua Caliente Club resort in Baja California. They married in Washington, D.C., in 1932.

On July 14, 1932, Rico was with Crofton on a plane which crashed near Mexico City. A terrific rain caused the pilot to fly their plane into a mountain. The pilot/airline owner was killed and Rico was severely cut and bruised. Rico filed suit for separate maintenance in March 1933 and asked for a sum of $2,000 monthly from Crofton.

In the action, Rico stated she was a motion picture actress who earned $375 per week in 1931. However, she was no longer able to make her living as an actress because of facial injuries sustained in the airplane crash. The proceedings were later withdrawn, and a reconciliation was followed by a second honeymoon to Hawaii.

In October 1933 it was rumored that Crofton had established residence in Reno, Nevada to obtain a divorce. He denied this, saying that he was in Reno for a business trip and planned to visit Rico in San Diego, California, afterward. The same month Rico obtained a divorce decree in San Diego. She claimed that her husband frequently used bad language and once struck her in the face. She reportedly obtained a substantial property settlement and $500 a month alimony.

Death
Rico died in Los Angeles, California on July 15, 1994.

Filmography

References
Daily Northwestern, Hollywood Film Shop, Saturday, September 8, 1928, Page 12.
Los Angeles Times, Mona Rico Has Just Finished Third Talkie, October 27, 1929, Page 24.
Los Angeles Times, Gilpin Dies In Crash, July 14, 1932, Page 1.
Los Angeles Times, Turfman Accused In Wife's Action, March 25, 1933, Page A1.
Los Angeles Times, Mona Rico Wins Divorce Decree, October 19, 1933, Page 6.
Los Angeles Times, She Plans Bid For Citizenship, May 27, 1934, Page 17.
Oakland, California Tribune, Actress' Mate Denies Divorce, Wednesday, October 11, 1933, Page 9.

American silent film actresses
American film actresses
Mexican emigrants to the United States
American actresses of Mexican descent
1907 births
1994 deaths
20th-century American actresses
WAMPAS Baby Stars